The Buckeye Bullet is a series of four experimental electric cars created by students from Ohio State University ( the Buckeyes) as a joint project with Venturi. The cars were designed to break the land speed record on the Bonneville Speedway, a salt flat just outside Wendover, Utah, United States.

The VBB's have also been called the Venturi "Jamais Contente", referencing the first electrically powered vehicle to top 100 km/h.

Buckeye Bullet Team 
The Buckeye Bullet team is composed of students from Ohio State University, primarily through the College of Engineering. Led by Dr. Giorgio Rizzoni, the team is provided research space from the Center of Automotive Research at the university.

Vehicles 
All Buckeye Bullet vehicles have been electrically powered, with power coming from either batteries or hydrogen fuel cells.

Buckeye Bullet 1 

The Buckeye Bullet 1 is a battery electric powered land speed race car, and the first from the Buckeye Bullet team.

Vehicle properties
Power source: 10,000 rechargeable c-cell batteries
Motor: Custom   3-phase AC power motor
Layout: rear-wheel drive
Body material: carbon fiber
Ride height/ground clearance: 
Curb weight: 
Length: 
Suspension: 4 wheel independent

Team

The 2004 Buckeye Bullet team members from Ohio State are team leaders Isaac S. Harper, Andrew L. Marquand, and Benjamin J. Sinsheimer; team members Kevin C. Sze, Sean M. MacGregor, Aaron M. Haliena, Joseph H. Gorse, Andrea J. Barger, Michael B. Quade, Kimberly A. Stevens and Kevin Ponziani; faculty adviser Giorgio Rizzoni, staff adviser Maria Soliman, and the vehicle's driver, Roger Schroer of TRC, Inc.

Buckeye Bullet 2 

The Buckeye Bullet 2, or BB2, was the second-generation, student-built, alternative-fuel race car created by the Buckeye Bullet team. It is the first hydrogen fuel cell vehicle land speed streamliner. It is front-wheel drive. At Speedweek 2008, the BB2 eclipsed its previous mark by reaching , the highest speed ever recorded by a hydrogen/fuel cell vehicle at that time.

Buckeye Bullet 2.5 
The Buckeye Bullet 2.5 was a battery electric version of the Buckeye Bullet 2. The BB2.5 uses the same frame and body as the Buckeye Bullet 2, but replaces the fuel cell power source with batteries. The BB2.5 raced for only one season in 2009. This vehicle was intended to be a testbed for several new technologies in consideration for use on the Buckeye Bullet 3. The most significant technology under consideration was the lithium ion batteries. The batteries used for the BB2.5 were A123 Systems 32113 cylindrical cells. The vehicle was able to set a FIA sanctioned world record at 307.666 mph(495.140 km/h).

Buckeye Bullet 3 
The Buckeye Bullet 3 is the final iteration of the project, building on the technology of the previous vehicles. It is 4-wheel drive and has a drag coefficient of 0.13. The car has separate powertrains for each axle, with the cockpit in the center. Each powertrain has two electric motors driving a 2-speed transmission, built by Hewland. 1st gear can be used up to 275 mph. Roger Schroer was the driver for the record breaking run.

See also 
 List of vehicle speed records

References

External links 
 
The Buckeye Bullet Homepage
The Buckeye Bullet Blog
The Ohio State University College of Engineering
Video of the Buckeye Bullet
Center for Automotive Research (CAR).
About the VBB Program

Electric land speed record cars
Wheel-driven land speed record cars
Ohio State University
Streamliner cars